Masahiko Minami (南 雅彦, Minami Masahiko) is a linguistics professor at San Francisco State University where he specializes in Japanese language and cross-cultural studies. He is editor-in-chief of the Journal of Japanese Linguistics. He is also coordinator for the Japanese Language Proficiency Test (日本語能力試験, Nihongo Nōryoku Shiken: JLPT) for Northern California. In addition, he served as president of the Foreign Language Association of Northern California (FLANC) and President of the Northern California Japanese Teachers’ Association (NCJTA).

Minami received a PhD from Harvard University under the supervision of Catherine E. Snow and Allyssa McCabe.

Selected works

References

External links
 Masahiko Minami
 Masahiko Minami
 Northern California Japanese Teachers' Association
 Kurosio Publishers

Japanese psychologists
Living people
Kyoto University alumni
Harvard Graduate School of Education alumni
People from Osaka Prefecture
Year of birth missing (living people)

ja:南雅彦